In cryptography, PKCS #11 is one of the Public-Key Cryptography Standards, and also refers to the programming interface to create and manipulate cryptographic tokens (a token where the secret is a cryptographic key).

Detail
The PKCS #11 standard defines a platform-independent API to cryptographic tokens, such as hardware security modules (HSM) and smart cards, and names the API itself "Cryptoki" (from "cryptographic token interface" and pronounced as "crypto-key", although "PKCS #11" is often used to refer to the API as well as the standard that defines it).

The API defines most commonly used cryptographic object types (RSA keys, X.509 certificates, DES/Triple DES keys, etc.) and all the functions needed to use, create/generate, modify and delete those objects.

Usage 

Most commercial certificate authority (CA) software uses PKCS #11 to access the CA signing key or to enroll user certificates. Cross-platform software that needs to use smart cards uses PKCS #11, such as Mozilla Firefox and OpenSSL (using an extension). It is also used to access smart cards and HSMs. Software written for Microsoft Windows may use the platform specific MS-CAPI API instead. Both Oracle Solaris and Red Hat Enterprise Linux contain implementations for use by applications, as well.

Relationship to KMIP
The Key Management Interoperability Protocol (KMIP) defines a wire protocol that has similar functionality to the PKCS#11 API.

The two standards were originally developed independently but are now both governed by an OASIS technical committee.  It is the stated objective of both the PKCS#11 and KMIP committees to align the standards where practicable.  For example, the PKCS#11 Sensitive and Extractable attributes are being added to KMIP version 1.4.  There is considerable overlap between members of the two technical committees.

History

The PKCS#11 standard originated from RSA Security along with its other PKCS standards in 1994. In 2013, RSA contributed the latest draft revision of the standard (PKCS#11 2.30) to OASIS to continue the work on the standard within the newly created OASIS PKCS11 Technical Committee. The following list contains significant revision information:
 01/1994: project launched
 04/1995: v1.0 published
 12/1997: v2.01 published
 12/1999: v2.10 published
 01/2001: v2.11 published
 06/2004: v2.20 published
 12/2005: amendments 1 & 2 (one-time password tokens, CT-KIP )
 01/2007: amendment 3 (additional mechanisms)
 09/2009: v2.30 draft published for review, but final version never published
 12/2012: RSA announce that PKCS #11 management is being transitioned to OASIS
 03/2013: OASIS PKCS #11 Technical Committee Inaugural meetings, works starts on v2.40 
 04/2015: OASIS PKCS #11 v2.40 specifications become approved OASIS standards 
 05/2016: OASIS PKCS #11 v2.40 Errata 01 specifications become approved OASIS errata 
 07/2020: OASIS PKCS #11 v3.0 specifications become approved OASIS standards

See also 
 List of applications using PKCS #11
 Microsoft CryptoAPI

References

External links
  - The PKCS #11 URI Scheme
 PKCS#11: Cryptographic Token Interface Standard
 OASIS PKCS #11 Technical Committee home page

Cryptography standards
Smart cards